(Basque for "Nationalist Workers' Committees") is a Basque left-wing nationalist and separatist trade union operating mainly in Spain currently led by Garbiñe Aranburu.

It was created in 1974 by Jon Idigoras among others. They are part of the Basque National Liberation Movement, an aggregation of leftist Basque nationalist forces including the illegal paramilitary organization Euskadi Ta Askatasuna (ETA) and the illegal parties Batasuna and Segi. It is supported by around 45.000 affiliates.

The union is legal and it is one of the four major of its kind in the Basque Country. In the last decades it has been working mostly with the other nationalist union, ELA, while both have been opposed often by the Spanish-wide trade unions, UGT and CC.OO., that make up their own bloc.

In 2019 it had the 19.1% of the labor delegates in the Basque Autonomous Community, being the second biggest union after the also left-wing and abertzale Basque Workers' Solidarity (ELA). In Navarre the union has similar results, with a total of 1054 labour delegates, the 16.95% of the total, being the fourth largest union after UGT, ELA and Workers' Commissions.

References 

Trade unions in Spain
Trade unions established in 1974
Basque nationalism
1974 establishments in Spain